Stolen Heaven is a 1974 Italian-German drama film directed by Theo Maria Werner and starring Siegfried Rauch, Hans Holt, and Christine Böhm.

It was partly shot on location in the Zillertal in the Austrian state of Tyrol.

Cast
 Siegfried Rauch as Jungpfarrer Franz Gruber
 Hans Holt as Altpfarrer Julius Bachmayer
 Christine Böhm as Barbara Brandner
 Maria Andergast as Mutter Brandner
 Michael Negri as Hannes Reyer
 Walter Sedlmayr as Franz Josef Reyer
 Maria Sigg as Walburga Reyer
 Wolf Goldan as Ernst Nortinger
 Rut Rex as Eva Siebert
 Johannes Wildauer as Korbinian Nortinger
 Susi Engel as Christl Siebert
 Michael Cramer as Lehrer Berger
 Andreas Bäuerl as Tankwart
 Franziska Stömmer as Frau Seidl
 Willy Harlander as Revierinspektor
 Michele Borelli as Kriminalkommissar Mario Raabe
 Franz Muxeneder as Wurzelsepp
 Gustl Gstettenbaur as Förster Auer

References

Bibliography 
 Bock, Hans-Michael & Bergfelder, Tim. The Concise Cinegraph: Encyclopaedia of German Cinema. Berghahn Books, 2009.

External links 
 

1974 films
1974 drama films
German drama films
West German films
1970s German-language films
Films directed by Theo Maria Werner
Italian drama films
Gloria Film films
Films shot in Austria
Films set in Austria
Films about Catholic priests
Films set in the Alps
Films about hunters
1970s German films
1970s Italian films